OR4 or OR-4 may refer to:

Other ranks (UK)
Oregon's 4th congressional district
Oregon Route 4, part of U.S. Route 97 in Oregon